Edmond Blake (1803–1895) was the last Mayor of the old Galway Corporation.

Blake was a member of one of The Tribes of Galway, and the son of a previous Mayor, Colonel John Blake (1830–1836). He served from 1836 to 1840.  In compensation for the loss of office, Blake received the Civic Sword and Mace in 1840.

He married Anne St. George of Tyrone House, Kilcolgan, and was survived by his daughter, Anne.

Sources 
 Henry, William (2002). Role of Honour: The Mayors of Galway City 1485-2001. Galway: Galway City Council.  

Mayors of Galway
Politicians from County Galway
1803 births
1895 deaths